Nikola Girke (born December 30, 1977 in Grande Prairie, Alberta) is a Canadian sailor and a five-time Olympian. She is amongst only a few elite athletes who have made the transition from one sport to another and has achieved a top 10 in the world across three different sport disciplines. She finished 13th at the 2004 Summer Olympics in the 470, then switched to RSX windsurfing and placed 17th at the 2008 Summer Olympics. At the 2012 Summer Olympics she finished 10th in the RS:X. Girke was named to Canada's 2016 Olympic team to compete in the 2016 Summer Olympics in Rio de Janeiro, as part of the Nacra 17 with Luke Ramsay. The duo placed 15th. Girke also competed in windsurfing at both the 2011 Pan American Games and the 2015 Pan American Games placing 4th and 6th respectively. Nikola holds a degree from UBC in Human Kinetics and is a Certified Executive and Emotional Intelligence coach.

She represented Canada for the fifth time at the 2020 Summer Olympics.

References

External links
 
 
 
 
 
 

1977 births
Living people
Canadian windsurfers
Female windsurfers
Canadian female sailors (sport)
Olympic sailors of Canada
Sailors at the 2004 Summer Olympics – 470
Sailors at the 2008 Summer Olympics – RS:X
Sailors at the 2012 Summer Olympics – RS:X
Sailors at the 2016 Summer Olympics – Nacra 17
Sailors at the 2020 Summer Olympics – RS:X
Pan American Games competitors for Canada
Sailors at the 2011 Pan American Games
Sailors at the 2015 Pan American Games
People from Grande Prairie
Sportspeople from Alberta